The GS&WR Class L2  Sambo was an 0-4-2 saddle tank engine used by the GSR of Ireland. The original "Sambo" model was a rebuild of an old Wakefield locomotive but in 1912;  Maunsell designed the saddle. The model was sent for scrap in 1962.

Notes

0-4-2 locomotives
Scrapped locomotives
Steam locomotives of Ireland
5 ft 3 in gauge locomotives